Cyllognatha is a genus of comb-footed spiders that was first described by Ludwig Carl Christian Koch in 1872.

Species
 it contains four species, found in Australia, Samoa, and India:
Cyllognatha affinis Berland, 1929 – Samoa
Cyllognatha gracilis Marples, 1955 – Samoa
Cyllognatha subtilis L. Koch, 1872 (type) – Australia (Lord Howe Is.), Samoa
Cyllognatha surajbe Patel & Patel, 1972 – India

See also
 List of Theridiidae species

References

Araneomorphae genera
Spiders of the Indian subcontinent
Spiders of Oceania
Taxa named by Carl Ludwig Koch
Theridiidae